Dr.N.S.A.M Pre University College (NSAM PUC) is an educational institute based in Bengaluru, Karnataka, India. It is affiliated with the Department of Pre University Education Board in Karnataka and is named after Dr. Nitte Shankara Adyanthaya, a philanthropic medical practitioner who contributed immensely to the upliftment of Nitte village.

The college is managed by the NITTE Education Trust, Mangalore, a distinguished trust in the field of education, established in 1979.

History
Dr NSAM Pre University College was established in the year 2011 under the aegis of NITTE Education Trust, which was established in 1979 by the committed philanthropist and legal luminary, Justice K S Hegde, who strongly believed that education, was pivotal to the progress of a community. The institutions under NET include Nitte Deemed to be University as well as colleges for engineering, medicine, dentistry, management, architecture and schools for primary and secondary education.

Academics
Dr.NSAM PU College offers Pre- University courses in Commerce and Science Streams.

Science
P.C.M.B – Physics, Chemistry, Mathematics and Biology
P.C.M.Cs - Physics, Chemistry, Mathematics and Computer Science

Commerce
E.B.A.Cs – Economics, Business studies, Accountancy and Computer science
E.B.A.S - Economics, Business studies, Accountancy and Statistics
E.B.A.Bm - Economics, Business studies, Accountancy and Basic mathematics

References

Universities and colleges in Bangalore
Education in Bangalore